Nannodiella fraternalis is a species of sea snail, a marine gastropod mollusk in the family Clathurellidae,.

Description
The shell grows to a length of 5 mm.

Distribution
This species is distributed in the Pacific Ocean from Baja California to Panama

References

External links
 

fraternalis